Hadula is a genus of moths of the family Noctuidae.

Species
 Hadula agrotiformis (Hampson, 1896)
 Hadula anthracina (Hacker, 1996)
 Hadula arenaria (Hampson, 1905)
 Hadula armata (Staudinger, 1888)
 Hadula atlantis (Schwingenschuss, 1955)
 Hadula baksana Schintlmeister & Poltawski, 1986
 Hadula basilewskyi (Berio, 1972)
 Hadula bergeri (Berio, 1972)
 Hadula brassicina (Draudt, 1934)
 Hadula chiklika (Moore, 1878)
 Hadula chimaera (Rothschild, 1920)
 Hadula colletti (Sparre-Schneider, 1876)
 Hadula crotchi (Grote, 1880)
 Hadula deserticola (Hampson, 1905)
 Hadula dianthi (Tauscher, 1809)
 Hadula engedina Hacker, 1998
 Hadula eremistis (Püngeler, 1904)
 Hadula eversmanni (Staudinger, 1900)
 Hadula explicata (Sukhareva, 1976)
 Hadula furca (Eversmann, 1852)
 Hadula furcula (Staudinger, 1889)
 Hadula gandhara Hacker, 1998
 Hadula gigantea (Rebel, 1909)
 Hadula gobideserti (Varga, 1973)
 Hadula gredosi (Laever, 1977)
 Hadula halodeserti Varga, 1973
 Hadula halolimna (Gyulai & Varga, 1998)
 Hadula hampsoni Hacker, 1998
 Hadula hoplites (Staudinger, 1901)
 Hadula hreblayi Hacker, 1998
 Hadula imperspicua Hacker, 1998
 Hadula inexpecta (Yoshimoto, 1995)
 Hadula insolita Staudinger, 1889
 Hadula insperata Gyulai & Hacker, 1998
 Hadula isoloma (Püngeler, 1904)
 Hadula latemarginata (Wiltshire, 1976)
 Hadula melanopa – Broad-Bordered White Underwing (Thunberg, 1791)
 Hadula mendax (Staudinger, 1879)
 Hadula mendica (Staudinger, 1895)
 Hadula militzae (Kozhantschikov, 1947)
 Hadula nekrasovi Gyulai & Varga, 1998
 Hadula nigrolunata (Packard, 1867) (mostly placed in the genus Anarta)
 Hadula nupponenorum Hacker & Fibiger, 2002
 Hadula ochrea (Warren, 1909)
 Hadula odontites (Boisduval, 1829)
 Hadula orbona Bang-Haas, 1912
 Hadula osmana Hacker, 1998
 Hadula parvula Hacker, 1998
 Hadula perdentata (Hampson, 1894)
 Hadula ptochica (Püngeler, 1900)
 Hadula pugnax (Hübner, [1824])
 Hadula quercii (Berio, 1941)
 Hadula sabulorum (Alphéraky, 1882)
 Hadula schawyra (Bang-Haas, 1927)
 Hadula schneideri (Staudinger, 1900)
 Hadula sodae (Boisduval, 1829)
 Hadula stigmosa (Christoph, 1887)
 Hadula trifolii – The Nutmeg (Hufnagel, 1766)
 Hadula triphaenopsis (Oberthür, 1893)
 Hadula ultramontana Gyulai & Hacker, 1998
 Hadula vaciva (Püngeler, 1906)
 Hadula vargai (Hreblay & Ronkay, 1998)
 Hadula vassilinini (O. Bang-Haas, 1927)

Former species
 Hadula alta is now Anarta alta (Barnes & Benjamin, 1942)
 Hadula castrae is now Anarta castrae (Barnes & McDunnough, 1912)
 Hadula chartaria is now Anarta chartaria (Grote, 1873)
 Hadula chunka (Smith, 1910) is now a synonym of Anarta crotchii (Grote, 1880)
 Hadula farnhami is now Anarta farnhami (Grote, 1873)
 Hadula fulgora is now Anarta fulgora (Barnes & McDunnough, 1918)
 Hadula hamata is now Anarta hamata (McDunnough, 1930)
 Hadula mutata is now Anarta mutata (Dod, 1913)
 Hadula oaklandiae is now Anarta oaklandiae (McDunnough, 1937)
 Hadula obesula is now Anarta obesula (Smith, 1904)
 Hadula oregonica is now Anarta oregonica (Grote, 1881)
 Hadula projecta is now Anarta projecta (McDunnough, 1938)
 Hadula subalbida is now Anarta subalbida (Barnes & Benjamin, 1924)

References
 Hadula at funet.fi
 Natural History Museum Lepidoptera genus database

Hadenini